Cheshmeh Shirin (also Romanized as Cheshmeh Shīrīn) is a village in Hendmini District, Badreh District, Badreh County, Ilam Province, Iran. At the 2006 census, its population was 1,172, in 261 families. The village is populated by Lurs.

References 

Populated places in Darreh Shahr County
Luri settlements in Ilam Province